Connor McGuiness (born February 2, 1995) is an American professional baseball coach for the Los Angeles Dodgers of Major League Baseball (MLB).

Career
McGuiness played college baseball at Emory University from 2009–2012, appearing in 41 games as a pitcher. He rejoined the school as pitching coach in 2014. He joined the Dodgers organization as a minor league pitching coach in 2017, working for the Rancho Cucamonga Quakes, Glendale Desert Dogs and Great Lakes Loons. In 2020 he joined the major league staff as assistant pitching coach.

References

1989 births
Living people
Baseball pitchers
Los Angeles Dodgers coaches
Emory Eagles baseball players
Emory Eagles baseball coaches
Minor league baseball coaches